Wapakoneta, is a city in and the county seat of Auglaize County, Ohio, United States, about  north of Dayton and  south of Toledo.  The population was 9,957  at the 2020 census. It is the principal city of and is included in the Wapakoneta, Ohio Micropolitan Area, which is included in the Lima–Van Wert–Wapakoneta, OH, Combined Statistical Area.

History

In 1748, the French built a trading post (Fort au Glaize, also known as "Wapakoneta Trading Post" or "AuGlaize Trading Post") about a half-mile northeast of the future site of Wapakoneta. After being re-established in 1760 as "Francis Duchouquet's Trading Post," the British later took over this territory after the French ceded it following defeat in the Seven Years' War. Neither they nor the later Americans (after independence) built a succeeding fort here. French-Canadian traders later reestablished a trading post at the site in 1784, which was abandoned after the Battle of Fallen Timbers in 1794.

The city itself was established in the 1780s as a Shawnee settlement called "Waughpaughkonnetta" (possibly derived from the Shawnee word "Wa-po'kanite," meaning "the place of white bones"). After the Shawnee tribe was removed to Kansas in 1831, Wapakoneta was platted in 1833 and later named as the seat of Auglaize County in 1848.

The Armstrong Air & Space Museum opened in Wapakoneta in 1972.

Geography

Wapakoneta is on the Auglaize River and includes parts of Duchouquet, Pusheta, and Moulton Townships.

Demographics

2010 census
As of the census of 2010, there were 9,867 people, 4,037 households, and 2,614 families residing in the city. The racial makeup of the city was 97.1% White, 0.4% African American, 0.3% Native American, 0.4% Asian, 0.6% from other races, and 1.2% from two or more races. Hispanic or Latino of any race were 1.6% of the population.

There were 4,037 households, of which 32.6% had children under the age of 18 living with them, 46.7% were married couples living together, 12.8% had a female householder with no husband present, 5.3% had a male householder with no wife present, and 35.2% were non-families. 30.5% of all households were made up of individuals, and 13.1% had someone living alone who was 65 years of age or older. The average household size was 2.39 and the average family size was 2.95.

The median age in the city was 37 years. 25.2% of residents were under the age of 18; 8.6% were between the ages of 18 and 24; 26% were from 25 to 44; 24.4% were from 45 to 64; and 15.6% were 65 years of age or older. The gender makeup of the city was 47.8% male and 52.2% female.

Sister cities
Wapakoneta has one sister city, as designated by the Sister Cities International: Lengerich, Nordrhein-Westfalen, Germany.

Lengerich's neighboring municipalities, Ladbergen and Lienen, are sister cities with Wapakoneta's neighbors New Knoxville and Saint Marys, respectively.

Education
Wapakoneta is home to Wapakoneta High School. The city has a public library, the main branch of the Auglaize County Public Library.

Notable people
Neil Armstrong, NASA Gemini 8/Apollo 11 astronaut, first man on the Moon
Charles Brading, pharmacist and politician
Kent Boyd, dancer, runner-up SYTYCD
Jennifer Crusie, romance novel writer
George Russell Davis, Associate Justice of the Arizona Territorial Supreme Court
Bob Ewing, Major League Baseball player
Dan Newland, journalist, translator, and writer
Dudley Nichols, Oscar-winning screenwriter
Wapakoneta is Armstrong's birthplace, and has several places named after him, such as the Armstrong Air and Space Museum, operated by the Ohio Historical Society, and Neil Armstrong Airport.

Popular culture
In the film Third Finger, Left Hand (1940), Melvyn Douglas's character is from Wapakoneta, and the film ends at the Wapakoneta railroad station.

See also
United Remnant Band of the Shawnee Nation

References

External links

City Website
Wapakoneta Area Economic Development Council
Wapakoneta Area Chamber of Commerce
Wapakoneta Daily News

 
County seats in Ohio
Populated places established in 1782
Cities in Auglaize County, Ohio
1782 establishments in North America
Cities in Ohio